Miami is the fifth album by Argentine rock group Babasónicos.

Track listing
 "4 AM"
 "Desfachatados" (Shameless)
 "El Ringo"
 "El Súmum" (The Best)
 "La Roncha" (The Swelling)
 "Paraguayana"
 "Valle de Valium" (Valium Valley)
 "Bardo de Estrella" (Mess of a Star)
 "El Playboy" 
 "Drag Dealer" 
 "Gustavo Show"
 "Combustible" (Fuel)
 "Charada" (Charade)
 "Grand Prix"
 "Colgado" (Hung)
 "Mal Viaje" (Bad Trip)
 "El Shopping" (The Mall)
 "Casualidad" (Coincidence)

1999 albums
Babasónicos albums